The 2010 World Artistic Gymnastics Championships was held at the Rotterdam Ahoy indoor sporting arena in the Netherlands from 16 to 24 October 2010. In this year's championships, there was a total of 73 participating federations with 615 gymnasts (343 men and 272 women). 53 men's and 44 women's teams competed.

Competition schedule 
The competition schedule was as follows (Local time, CEST):

Saturday, 16 October 2010  
10:00 – 22:00 Women's qualifying competition

Sunday, 17 October 2010
10:00 – 19:15 Women's qualifying competition

Monday, 18 October 2010 
09:00 – 22:15 Men's qualifying competition

Tuesday, 19 October 2010  
09:00 – 22:15 Men's qualifying competition

Wednesday, 20 October 2010  
17:00 – 19:00 Women's team final

Thursday, 21 October 2010  
17:00 – 20:00 Men's team final

Friday, 22 October 2010  
16:00 – 18:30 Men's all-round final 
19:30 – 22:00 Women's all-round final

Saturday, 23 October 2010  
14:00 – 18:00 Women's event finals: vault, bars  
14:00 – 18:00 Men's event finals: floor, pommel horse, rings

Sunday, 24 October 2010  
14:00 – 18:00 Women's event finals: beam, floor  
14:00 – 18:00 Men's event finals: vault, bars, high bar

Participating Countries

Some of the countries that participated.

 
 
 
 
 
 
 
  Bulgaria
 
 
 
 
 
 
 
 
 
  Great Britain

Gymnasts 
More than 70 countries were expected to compete in the event.

Oldest and youngest competitors

Medalists

Men's results

Qualification

Team all-around 

Oldest and youngest competitors

The top three scores from each country for each apparatus was counted towards the total. In the qualifying round, the top four were counted. In all, 45 nations entered the qualifying round. Unlike the women's team event, there was more inconsistency in the strengths and weaknesses of the team. China qualified first overall; they came first in the parallel bars, second or third in three apparatuses, but tenth in the floor. Japan qualified second, 1.082 behind. They came first in rings, second or third in three disciplines and 11th in floor. The US were third, more than four points behind. They came first in high bar, but 13th in pommel horse, and between fourth and sixth in the other events. They were ahead of Great Britain by only 0.059. Great Britain came first in floor and pommel but were only ninth and tenth in parallel bars and rings respectively. Germany was fifth, followed by Russia, who came first in vault but were eighth or worse in three disciplines. The last two teams to qualify were Korea and France, the latter denying Romania qualification by 0.150, or 0.04%. Italy, Spain and Puerto Rico were all within 1.1 points of qualification. The hosts came 17th, more than six points outside qualification.

After qualifying in last place, France improved to finish fifth in the final, while Great Britain regressed from fourth to seventh.

Individual all-around 
In all 299 men competed in the qualifying round. Of these 164 complete all six apparatus. Each nation had up to six entrants, but were limited to two qualifiers for the 24-man final. Steven Legendre of the US, Kenya Kobayashi of Japan and Kristian Thomas of Great Britain ended 15th, 16th and 17th respectively, but were their nation's third best and did not progress to the final. Ruslan Paneleymonov (Britain, 19th) and Andrey Cherkasov (Russia, 21st) were the others affected by this policy. Kōhei Uchimura was the highest qualifier, more than two points ahead of Philipp Boy.

Oldest and youngest competitors

Floor 

Oldest and youngest competitors

Pommel horse 

Oldest and youngest competitors

Rings 

Oldest and youngest competitors

Vault 

Oldest and youngest competitors

Thomas Bouhail became the first French gymnast to become a world champion.

Parallel bars 

Oldest and youngest competitors

Horizontal bar 

Oldest and youngest competitors

Zhang Chenglong of China edged out local favorite Epke Zonderland by 0.133 to win this event.

Women's results

Qualification

Team all-around 

Oldest and youngest competitors

As with the men, the top three scores from each country for each apparatus was counted towards the total. In the qualifying round, the top four scores were included. In all, 34 nations entered the qualifying round. Russia came second in each of the four disciplines to qualify first overall. China came first in the uneven bars and third and fourth in the remaining apparatus, to qualify second overall. The United States was first in vault and beam, but only fifth in floor, and came third overall. Less than one point separated the top three. Romania came first in floor to qualify fourth, more than five points behind the US. There were more than 3 points down to the next two qualifiers, Great Britain and Australia. The host nation missed qualification by 1.6 points.

Russia won their first ever women's team title. It was a close-run contest with the result hinging on Russia's final floor performer. In the final, the US came sixth in the floor, losing 2.666 to Russia and 1.566 to China on this apparatus. The US' third-best floor score was the lowest of the 24 included scores for the apparatus. After qualifying in last place, Japan improved to finish fifth in the final. He Kexin of China posted the highest score of the meet on the uneven bars, scoring a 16.133 in the team finals. This made her the only female gymnast of the meet to score in the 16's.

Individual all-around 
In all 216 women competed in the qualifying round. Of these 142 completed all four apparatus. Each nation had up to six entrants, but were limited to two qualifiers for the 24-woman final. The highest ranked person affected by this was Mackenzie Caquatto, who was the third highest American. She finished ninth, less than 1.2 from the third highest qualifier. Mattie Larson (USA, 11th), Ksenia Afanasyeva (Russia, 17th) and Emily Little (Australia, 23rd) were the others in the top 24 to be excluded from the final. Aliya Mustafina qualified first, 1.585 ahead of Rebecca Bross. Aly Raisman qualified third, but she fell in the uneven bars in the final, and came equal last in that apparatus to end up 13th overall. Jiang Yuyuan qualified fourth, but placed second in  the final.

Oldest and youngest competitors

Vault 

Oldest and youngest competitors

Tatiana Nabieva's assistant coach Alexander Kiryashov contested Nabieva's reduced start value on her first vault. Nabieva's 1st vault's S.V. was a 6.5, attempting a 2.5 twist, but was brought down to a 5.8 when she did not complete the twist. Her 2nd vault had originally had a 6.1 start value, but then she was penalized once again for piking her form and landing out of bounds and was brought down to a 5.7.

Uneven bars 

Oldest and youngest competitors

Balance beam 

Oldest and youngest competitors

Floor 

Oldest and youngest competitors

Lauren Mitchell became the first Australian female world champion in gymnastics, posting the highest score after being last to perform in the final. Defending champion Beth Tweddle of Great Britain failed to qualify, she was a reserve for the final.

Medal table 
Women's all-around champion Aliya Mustafina won three individual apparatus medals, accounting for four of Russia's five medals in individual events. Men's all-around champion Kōhei Uchimura was involved in all of Japan's four medals, one of them a silver in the teams event.

Overall

Men

Women

See also 

 2010 European Men's Artistic Gymnastics Championships
 2010 European Women's Artistic Gymnastics Championships

References

External links

 
World Artistic Gymnastics Championships
G
World Artistic Gymnastics Championships
International gymnastics competitions hosted by the Netherlands